El Observador (EO) is a weekly bilingual (English and Spanish) print and online newspaper, which has been in business since 1980.

El Observador was the first Bilingual weekly newspaper publication in the San Jose-San Francisco-Oakland Metropolitan Area.  It is published out of San Jose.

Description 
As of 2019, EO was the largest bilingual print and digital weekly newspaper in the Bay Area. It publishes weekly in print, digital newspaper and on its social media platforms.

El Observador partners with many Governments (Federal, State, County and City), Educational Institutions (University, Junior College, Private High Schools, Charter School and Trade Schools) and Business Enterprises, and provides weekly outreach to the growing Hispanic communities in the San Jose-San Francisco-Oakland Metropolitan Area. and English) format.

References

External links

 Website 

Companies based in San Jose, California
Newspapers published in San Jose, California
Spanish-language newspapers published in California
Bilingual newspapers
1980 establishments in California
Weekly newspapers published in California